Deiracephalus is an extinct genus of trilobites. It lived from 501 to 490 million years ago during the Dresbachian faunal stage of the late Cambrian Period.

References

Llanoaspididae
Ptychopariida genera
Cambrian trilobites
Fossils of the United States
Paleozoic life of Yukon